Yerkebulan Kossayev (born 30 October 1988 in Semey) is a Kazakhstani judoka who competes in the men's 60 kg category. At the 2012 Summer Olympics, he was defeated in the third round.

He competed in the men's 60 kg event at the 2014 World Judo Championships held in Chelyabinsk, Russia.

References

External links
 
 

Kazakhstani male judoka
Living people
Olympic judoka of Kazakhstan
1988 births
Judoka at the 2012 Summer Olympics
Judoka at the 2010 Asian Games
Sportspeople from Semey
Asian Games competitors for Kazakhstan
21st-century Kazakhstani people